Båtsfjord Church is a parish church of the Church of Norway in Båtsfjord Municipality in Troms og Finnmark county, Norway. It is located in the village of Båtsfjord. It is the main church for the Båtsfjord parish which is part of the Varanger prosti (deanery) in the Diocese of Nord-Hålogaland. The modern, brick church was built in a long church style in 1971 using plans drawn up by the architect Hans Magnus. The church seats about 300 people.

Media gallery

See also
List of churches in Nord-Hålogaland

References

Båtsfjord
Churches in Finnmark
Long churches in Norway
Brick churches in Norway
20th-century Church of Norway church buildings
Churches completed in 1971
1971 establishments in Norway